Alexander Shuckburgh, who is also known as Al Shux, is a British record producer and songwriter from London, England. Shux has worked with musical artists Jay-Z, Alicia Keys, Snoop Dogg, Nas, Kendrick Lamar, Plan B, Tinie Tempah and Lana Del Rey.

Career
In 2009, Shux produced and co-wrote the Jay-Z track "Empire State of Mind", which earned him a Grammy in the Best Rap Song Award category.

In 2012, Shux scored the music for Plan B's film Ill Manors. Shux also co-wrote and produced seven tracks on Plan B's Mercury Prize nominated album ilL Manors, including the title track which The Guardian hailed as "the greatest British protest song in years."

In 2018, Shux co-wrote and produced Kendrick Lamar and SZA's "All the Stars" for the Black Panther OST. The song was nominated for multiple Grammy awards, a Golden Globe award, and an Oscar.

Songwriting and production credits

Awards and nominations
2022

64th Grammy Awards
Nominated: Album Of The Year -- Doja Cat - Planet Her

2019

91st Academy Awards
Nominated: Best Original Song -- All The Stars

61st Grammy Awards
Nominated: Record Of The Year -- All The Stars
Nominated: Song Of The Year -- All The Stars
Nominated: Best Song Written For Visual Media -- All The Stars

76th Golden Globe Awards
Nominated: Best Original Song -- All The Stars

2013 
Ivor Novello Awards
Nominated: Best Contemporary Song Ill Manors performed by Plan B
Nominated: Best Original Film Score Ill Manors performed by Plan B
Brit Awards
Nominated: MasterCard BriSsh Album of the Year Plan B -‐ Ill Manors

2012 
Mercury Music Prize
Nominated: Best Album -‐ Ill Manors
MOBO's
Won: Best Hip Hop/Grime: Plan B
53rd Grammy Awards
Nominated: Record Of The Year -‐ Empire State of Mind 
Won: Best Rap Song -‐ Empire State of Mind

2010 
ASCAP
Won: Song Of The Year -‐ Empire State of Mind 
Won: Rap Song Of The Year -‐ Empire State of Mind
Nominated: Most Performed Songs Of The Year -‐ Empire State of Mind

2006 
Mercury Music Prize
Nominated: Album Of The Year – Sway -‐ This is my Demo

References

External links
 Alexander Shuckburgh accepting 2011 Grammy Award (photo)
 Al Shux interview at VIBE.com (4 December 2009)

1982 births
Living people
A
British male singer-songwriters
Grammy Award winners for rap music